is a rural district located in Gunma Prefecture, Japan. As of January 2015, the district had an estimated population of 3,272 and an area of 296.45 km2, with a population density of 11 people per square kilometer.

Towns and villages

Kanna
Ueno
Parts of the city of Takasaki and all of the city of Fujioka were formerly part of the district.

History

Tano District was created on April 1, 1896 by the merger of the former districts of Minamikanra, Tago and Midono. At the time of its creation, the district had four towns (Yoshii, Fujioka, Onishi and Shin) and 14 villages. 

1926, April 1 – Kamikawa village was raised to town status; renamed Mamba Town
1954, April 1 – Fujioka annexed Kanna, Ono, Midori and Mikuri villages and was elevated to city status
1954, October 1 – Onishi annexed neighboring Mihara, and Sanbagawa villages 
1955, January 1 – Yoshii annexed Tago, Irino villages and Iwadaira village from Kanra District
1955, March 1 – Fujioka annexed Hirai, Hino villages
1956, September 30 – Yawata village was annexed by Takasaki City
2003, April 1 – Manba town and Nakasato village merged, forming Kanna Town
2006, January 1 – Onishi town was annexed by Fujioka City
2006, January 23 – Shin Town was annexed by Takasaki City
2009, June 1 – Yoshii Town was annexed by Takasaki City

Districts in Gunma Prefecture